Kevin Curtis is an American football wide receiver.

Kevin Curtis may also refer to:

 Kevin Curtis (safety) (born 1980), American football coach and former safety
Kevin Adam Curtis, filmmaker
Kevin Curtis (rugby) for Valley Fort RFC
Kevin Curtis (sailor), participated in Sailing at the 1996 Summer Paralympics